Most or Möst or variation, may refer to:

Places
 Most, Kardzhali Province, a village in Bulgaria
 Most (city), a city in the Czech Republic
 Most District, a district surrounding the city
 Most Basin, a lowland named after the city
 Autodrom Most, motorsport race track near Most
 Möst, Khovd, a district in Khovd, Mongolia
 Most, Mokronog-Trebelno, a settlement in Slovenia

Other uses
 Most (surname), including a list of people with the surname
 Franz Welser-Möst (born 1960), Austrian conductor
 Most (1969 film), a film about WWII Yugoslavian partisans
 Most (2003 film), a Czech film
 Most!, 2018 Czech TV series
 Most (grape) or Chasselas
 most (Unix), a terminal pager on Unix and Unix-like systems
 Most (wine) or Apfelwein
 most, an English degree determiner
 Monolithic System Technology (MoST), a defunct American fabless semiconductor company

See also

 MOST (disambiguation)
 The Most (disambiguation)
 Must (disambiguation)
 Moest (disambiguation)